GOX, Gox, or GOx may refer to:
 Central Banda language
 Church of the Genuine Orthodox Christians of Greece
 Gaseous oxygen, as propellant in rocket engines
 Glucose oxidase (GOx)
 Gobu language
 Goxhill railway station, in England
 Hydroxyacid oxidase (glycolate oxidase) 1
 Mt. Gox, a former Bitcoin exchange
 New Goa International Airport